Icius pulchellus is a jumping spider species in the genus Icius that lives in South Africa. It is related to Icius minimus.

References

Endemic fauna of South Africa
Salticidae
Spiders of South Africa
Spiders described in 2011
Taxa named by Wanda Wesołowska